Ed Ochiena (born January 26, 1938) is a retired Canadian football player who played for the Toronto Argonauts and Hamilton Tiger Cats.

References

Living people
1938 births